Castanea henryi, Henry chestnut, Henry's chestnut, or Chinese chinquapin (a name it shares with Castanea seguinii), pearl chestnut, and in , zhui li, is a species of chestnut native to south-central and southeast China. A tree reaching 30m, it is a source of good timber, but has smaller nuts than its size might suggest. Like its close relative Castanea mollissima (Chinese chestnut) it is widely cultivated in China, and quite a few varieties have been developed in recent times.

References

henryi
Endemic flora of China
Trees of China
Plants described in 1916